Clive Myrie (born 25 August 1964) is a British journalist, newsreader and presenter who works for the BBC. Since August 2021 he has been the host of the long-running BBC quiz shows Mastermind and Celebrity Mastermind.

Early life
Myrie was born on 25 August 1964 in Bolton, Lancashire, England, to Jamaican immigrant parents, who came to the United Kingdom in the 1960s. His uncle Cecil was a munitions driver in the Royal Air Force during the war. His mother was a seamstress who worked for Mary Quant, while his father Norris was a factory worker who made car batteries and carpets. His parents are divorced, and his father returned to Jamaica following his retirement. Myrie was educated at Hayward Grammar School in his home town of Bolton, followed by Bolton Sixth Form College, where he completed his A-levels. He graduated from the University of Sussex with a Bachelor of Laws degree in 1985.

Career
Myrie joined the BBC in 1987 as a trainee local radio reporter, on the corporation's graduate journalism programme. His first assignment was as a reporter for Radio Bristol in 1988, returning to the BBC after a year with Independent Radio News. He then reported for Points West, and latterly BBC Television and Radio News.

In 1996 he became a BBC foreign correspondent and has since reported from more than 80 countries. He initially became the BBC's Tokyo correspondent, and was then the Los Angeles correspondent from 1997 to 1999. He was appointed a BBC Asia Correspondent in 2002 and was Paris correspondent from 2006 to 2007. His career has encompassed major stories such as the impeachment of U.S. President Bill Clinton, and wars in Kosovo, Afghanistan and Iraq. During the invasion of Iraq by coalition forces in March 2003, Myrie was an embedded correspondent with 40 Commando Royal Marines, joining them initially on HMS Ocean and subsequently during operations on the Al-Faw Peninsula. Myrie had to write a "goodbye" letter to his family, in case of his death due to the danger this particular assignment posed.

After latterly serving as Europe correspondent based in Brussels, he was appointed a presenter on the BBC News Channel in April 2009, replacing the retired Chris Lowe. Since joining BBC News, Myrie has presented the BBC Weekend News and weekend editions of BBC News at Ten and BBC Breakfast, both on BBC One. In June 2014, he began presenting weekday bulletins on BBC One.

In September 2010 Myrie broke the story that ETA had declared a unilateral ceasefire after he met an ETA operative in Paris, who handed over a tape of the organisation's leaders making the declaration.

He has presented the 18:30-to-midnight slot, Monday to Thursday, on the BBC News Channel. During the 2015 general election, he was the main presenter of Election Tonight at 19:30 and 21:30. Since 2019, Myrie has focused on BBC One network bulletins with the evening shift presented by a set of relief presenters. 

Myrie reported extensively from Kathmandu on the earthquake that struck the city on 25 April 2015, including the rescues of two Nepali citizens who were found alive under two collapsed buildings on 30 April 2015. In October 2017, Myrie visited Bangladesh to report on the Rohingya refugee crisis.

Myrie has occasionally presented on BBC World News, including World News Today, World News America and the 2016 US election. He appeared as a guest on BBC One's Have I Got News for You on 15 April 2016. In September 2017, Myrie appeared as a panellist on Richard Osman's House of Games quiz show. He has also presented with Katty Kay the current affairs programme Beyond 100 Days.

In 2019 Myrie began presenting the BBC News at Six and BBC News at Ten on alternate Fridays with Sophie Raworth following the departure of Fiona Bruce to Question Time. He now presents the BBC News at Ten on Fridays and in the absence of Huw Edwards.

On 22 March 2021 it was announced that Myrie would become the new host of the flagship BBC Two quiz show Mastermind and its BBC One spin-off show, Celebrity Mastermind, following John Humphrys' decision to leave after 18 years. Myrie made his debut as host on 23 August 2021. In November 2021, he featured as a guest participant in an episode of the BBC Two programme Celebrity Antiques Road Trip with fellow newsreader Reeta Chakrabarti.

Myrie hosted a documentary series on Jazz FM entitled The Definitive History of Jazz In Britain, broadcasting over ten weeks from 4 April to 6 June 2021. He also occasionally presents classical music on BBC Radio 3.

In February 2022 he travelled to Ukraine and was the anchor for BBC coverage of the 2022 Russian invasion of Ukraine. In one report on the invasion, Myrie stated that he and other journalists were staying in the city as "We all want to tell the story of this war, and we want to tell it accurately." On 8 March, he announced his return to the UK but promised he would return to the warzone.

Personal life
Myrie is married to Catherine Myrie, an upholsterer and furniture restorer. Myrie met his wife, who then worked in publishing, at the 1992 London launch of a book about Swiss cheeses. According to Myrie, she "gave me the courage and space to pursue my dreams."

Myrie enjoys going to the cinema and his favourite music genre is jazz, which he discovered at university. While at school he learned to play the violin and the trumpet and played in the local youth orchestra; appearing on Saturday Live in February 2022 his Inheritance Tracks were "Welcome to My World" by Jim Reeves and "So What" by Miles Davis. He is a supporter of Manchester City F.C.

Myrie has experienced racist abuse, which has included death threats, and being the recipient of a card, with a gorilla on the front, which read: "We don't want people like you on our TV screens."

Awards
Myrie has won several nominations for his work, most significantly for his role in the BAFTA-nominated BBC team behind coverage of the Mozambique floods in 2000. He was awarded the Bayeux-Calvados Award for war correspondents for his reporting of ethnic violence on the island of Borneo.

In 2016, he received an honorary doctorate from Staffordshire University. In 2019, the University of Sussex awarded him a "Doctor of the University" degree. In 2022, he received an honorary doctorate from University of Bolton, which he described as "an honour".

In the RTS Television Journalism Awards 2021, Myrie was named both "Television Journalist of the Year" and "Network Presenter of the Year", winning the accolades "for his versatile, measured and compelling style".

References

External links

 
 BBC Newswatch profile
 Jacqui Bealing, "'Although I was a northern black kid, I found a way of fitting in'", University of Sussex,  22 January 2019.

	

1964 births
Alumni of the University of Sussex
BBC newsreaders and journalists
Black British television personalities
English male journalists
English people of Jamaican descent
English reporters and correspondents
English war correspondents
Living people
People from Bolton